'Abd al-Samad is a popular Arabic given name.

ʻAbd al-Ṣamad may also refer to:

Buildings
Sultan Abdul Samad Building, Kuala Lumpur
Sultan Abdul Samad Mosque, Selangor
Makam Sultan Abdul Samad, Selangor

Sports
Abdul Samad (Indian cricketer), Indian cricketer who plays for Jammu & Kashmir

Other uses
S.M.K. Sultan Abdul Samad, secondary school in Petaling Jaya, Malaysia
The Abdulsamad Brothers (Khiry, Hakim, Tajh and Bilal) part of The Boys